Blackbird is a play written in 2005 by Scottish playwright David Harrower. It was inspired in part by the crimes of sex offender Toby Studebaker, and depicts a young woman meeting a middle-aged man fifteen years after being sexually abused by him when she was twelve.

David Harrower's Blackbird is not to be confused with the Adam Rapp play of the same name.

Synopsis
At his workplace, 55-year-old Ray is shocked to be visited by a young woman, 27-year-old Una. Fifteen years earlier, they had a sexual relationship for three months when Una was 12 and Ray was 40; subsequently, Ray had been jailed for three years for statutory rape. Ultimately, they ran off together, and, while Ray was taking time to compose himself after realizing what he had just done, he left her alone in a motel room. She got worried and left to find him, which led to both of them frantically searching for one another and raising suspicions within the small coastal town where they were staying. Eventually, a couple out walking their dog took Una in and called the police after learning why she was there. Ray was then arrested and imprisoned. Upon his release, he managed to establish a reasonably successful new life under another name, but Una recognized him in a photograph and tracked him down.

Ray takes Una to the office break room, where the two engage in a long and difficult confrontation involving Una's continuing struggles to understand and come to terms with the abuse and her intensely conflicting emotions, which pivot between anger, curiosity, confusion, and even a persistent attachment to Ray, whom Una loved – and she believed that he loved her. The fearful Ray, who is himself trying to forget the past and the potential feelings he had for Una, parries her demanding questions and descriptions of her feelings and experiences, all the while uncertain of her intentions.

Film adaptation
A film adaptation of the play titled Una premiered in September 2016 at the Telluride Film Festival. The film stars Rooney Mara as Una and Ben Mendelsohn as Ray.

Productions
Blackbird was commissioned by the Edinburgh International Festival and the Institute for Advanced Studies in the Humanities at the University of Edinburgh, with a 2005 premiere at the festival, directed by Peter Stein.  In February 2006, it opened at the West End Albery Theatre with Roger Allam and Jodhi May. In September 2006, it was well received in Stockholm at Dramaten (Royal Dramatic Theatre), in a co-production with Helsingborg City Theatre, directed by Eva Dahlman; with Göran Stangertz and Anna Björk. In the spring of 2007, the play had simultaneous American premieres by the Manhattan Theatre Club (off-Broadway) and at American Conservatory Theater in San Francisco. The New York production was directed by Joe Mantello, and featured Jeff Daniels and Alison Pill in the lead roles. In April 2008, the play was revived by David Grindley at the Rose Theatre, Kingston, prior to a national tour of the UK. In March 2008, the play opened in Mumbai, India, starring Indian film and theatre veterans Akash Khurana and Shernaz Patel. This Akvarious production was also later presented in Bangalore and in New Delhi. Shernaz Patel went on to win the award for Best Actress, for her portrayal of Una, at the 2010 Mahindra Excellence in Theatre Awards.

A 2016 Broadway revival was mounted at the Belasco Theatre on 5 February 2016 (37 previews), and opened officially on 10 March (through 11 June 108 performances), starring Michelle Williams and Jeff Daniels. It was directed by Joe Mantello. It received critical praise.

Blackbird had its South Korean run on 13 October to 13 November 2016, at the DCF Daemyung Culture Factory Theater in Seoul's Jongno District. Cho Jae-hyun portrayed Ray while Chae Soo-bin and Ok Ja-yeon were alternates in the role of Una.

Awards and nominations
2006 Critics' Awards for Theatre in Scotland for Best New Play
2007 Laurence Olivier Award for Best New Play
2016 Tony Award for Best Revival of a Play nomination
2016 Tony Award for Best Actor in a Play (Jeff Daniels) nomination
2016 Tony Award for Best Actress in a Play (Michelle Williams) nomination

References

Further reading

External links
 Actors Jeff Daniels and Michelle Williams discuss the revival of David Harrower's acclaimed 2005 play, Blackbird, Charlie Rose

2005 plays
Broadway plays
Off-Broadway plays
Laurence Olivier Award-winning plays
Scottish plays
West End plays
One-act plays
Two-handers
British plays adapted into films